783 Nora (prov. designation:  or ) is a dark background asteroid from the inner regions of the asteroid belt. It was discovered by Austrian astronomer Johann Palisa at the Vienna Observatory on 18 March 1914. It was likely named after Nora Helmer, principal character in the play A Doll's House by Norwegian poet Henrik Ibsen.

Orbit and classification 

Nora is a non-family asteroid of the main belt's background population when applying the hierarchical clustering method to its proper orbital elements. It orbits the Sun in the inner asteroid belt at a distance of 1.8–2.9 AU once every 3 years and 7 months (1,310 days; semi-major axis of 2.34 AU). Its orbit has an eccentricity of 0.23 and an inclination of 9° with respect to the ecliptic.

Naming 

This minor planet was likely named after Nora Helmer, the heroine in the play A Doll's House (1879) by Norwegian poet Henrik Ibsen (1828–1906). The name was given by the discoverer's friends. The  was also mentioned in The Names of the Minor Planets by Paul Herget in 1955.

Physical characteristics 

In the Bus–Binzel SMASS classification, Nora is a common, carbonaceous C-type asteroid. In the Tholen classification it is one of few asteroids considered unclassifiable.

Rotation period 

In March 2018, a rotational lightcurve of Nora was obtained from photometric observations by Tom Polakis at the Command Module Observatory  in Arizona. Lightcurve analysis gave a rotation period of  hours with a low brightness variation of  magnitude.

Diameter and albedo 

The Collaborative Asteroid Lightcurve Link derives an albedo of 0.0404 and a diameter of 39.84 kilometers based on an absolute magnitude of 11.1. These timed observations are taken when the asteroid passes in front of a distant star.

References

External links 
 Lightcurve Database Query (LCDB), at www.minorplanet.info
 Dictionary of Minor Planet Names, Google books
 Asteroids and comets rotation curves, CdR – Geneva Observatory, Raoul Behrend
 Discovery Circumstances: Numbered Minor Planets (1)-(5000) – Minor Planet Center
 
 

000783
Discoveries by Johann Palisa
Named minor planets
000783
000783
19140318